The 2010 Winter Olympics were held in Vancouver, British Columbia, Canada, from February 12 to February 28, 2010. A total of 2,632 athletes representing 82 National Olympic Committees participated in these Games. Overall, 86 events in 15 disciplines were contested; 46 events were open to men, 38 to women and 2 were mixed pairs. Two disciplines were open only to men: Nordic combined and ski jumping, while figure skating was the only sport in which men and women competed together in teams. Two new events were introduced: men's and women's ski cross.

Medals were won by 450 individual athletes from 26 countries; 19 of those countries won at least one gold. Canada won its first gold medal at an Olympic Games it hosted, having failed to do so at both the 1976 Summer Olympics in Montreal and the 1988 Winter Olympics in Calgary. Canada finished first in gold medal wins and became the first host nation since Norway in 1952 to lead the gold medal count, with 14. Canada also broke the record for the most golds won at a single Winter Olympics, which was previously 13, set by the Soviet Union in 1976 and Norway in 2002. The United States placed first in total medals—its second time doing so in a Winter Games—and set a record for most medals won at a single Winter Olympics, with 37, breaking the previous record of 36, set by Germany in 2002.

In the men's individual event in biathlon, two silver medals were awarded for a second-place tie. No bronze medal was awarded for that event. Athletes from Slovakia (Anastasiya Kuzmina – biathlon, women's sprint) and Belarus (Aleksei Grishin – freestyle skiing, men's aerials) won the first Winter Olympic gold medals for their nations. Norwegian cross-country skier Marit Bjørgen was the most successful athlete, winning three gold, one silver and one bronze medal, and became the ninth Winter Olympian to win five medals at one edition of the Games. Chinese short-track speed skater Wang Meng also won three gold medals.

{| id="toc" class="toc" summary="Contents"
|align="center" colspan=3|Contents
|-
|
Alpine skiing
Biathlon
Bobsleigh
Cross-country skiing
Curling
|valign=top|
Figure skating
Freestyle skiing
Ice hockey
Luge
Nordic combined
|valign=top|
Short track speed skating
Skeleton
Ski jumping
Snowboarding
Speed skating
|-
|align=center colspan=3| Medal leaders       References
|}


Alpine skiing

Bobsleigh

Cross-country skiing

Curling

Figure skating

Freestyle skiing

Ice hockey

Luge

Nordic combined

Short track speed skating

Skeleton

Ski jumping

Snowboarding

Speed skating

Medal leaders

Athletes that won at least two gold medals or at least three total medals are listed below.

See also
 2010 Winter Olympics medal table
 List of 2010 Winter Paralympics medal winners

References

External links

Medal winners
2010